Walak is a Papuan language of the Indonesian New Guinea Highlands.

References

Dani languages